Suter may refer to:

Suter, surname
Suter, West Virginia
 Suter (computer program), U.S. military computer program developed by BAE Systems that attacks computer networks and communications systems belonging to an enemy